NHS Barnet (legally known as Barnet Primary Care Trust) was the statutory NHS body responsible for improving the health of the resident population within the London Borough of Barnet.  It commissioned services for the second largest London borough, both in terms of geographical size and population.

Barnet Primary Care Trust was established on 1 April 2001, taking on functions previously undertaken by the three former Barnet Primary Care Groups and Barnet Health Authority.  The Trust also assumed responsibility for the community services previously provided by Barnet Healthcare NHS Trust (other than mental health services, which were provided by Barnet, Enfield and Haringey Mental Health NHS Trust.  In May 2009 Barnet Primary Care Trust was renamed NHS Barnet in line with a national move to create a ‘one-stop’ contact for all NHS services for patients.  In legal terms the organisation remained Barnet Primary Care Trust.  On 1 April 2010 it was announced that Barnet Community Services, the provider arm of the Trust would be moved to the Central London Community Healthcare Trust.

NHS Barnet was responsible for managing the local health system, for developing services and for making financial investments.

NHS Barnet commissioned services from GPs, dentists, optometrists, community pharmacists, private providers, voluntary sector, acute hospitals and mental health trusts.  Together, NHS Barnet and its commissioned providers provided a range of services at health centres and clinics across the Borough and at the Trust's two main community hospitals (Edgware Community Hospital, rebuilt and re-opened in February 2005 and Finchley Memorial Hospital, extended in 2013).

NHS Barnet held an annual budget of approximately £500 million (with annual fluctuations).  Approximately half was spent on acute care commissioning.

Following an inspection by the Care Quality Commission in 2015, Barnet, Enfield and Haringey Mental Health Trust obtained an overall rating of ‘requires improvement’.
In October 2016, a draft Sustainability and Transformation Plan (STP) was submitted to NHS England by the NHS in North Central London (representing Barnet, Haringey, Islington, Camden and Enfield) proposing changes and improvements to their future services.

See also
 Healthcare in London

References

External links 
 NHS Barnet website
 NHS Barnet young persons website

Health in the London Borough of Barnet
Defunct NHS trusts